Miss Brazil 2016, officially Miss Brazil Be Emotion 2016, was the 62nd edition of the Miss Brazil pageant. It was held on 1 October 2016 at Citibank Hall in São Paulo, and was hosted by Cássio Reis and Daniele Suzuki with Karol Pinheiro as a backstage correspondent. Marthina Brandt of Rio Grande do Sul crowned her successor Raissa Santana of Paraná at the end of the event. Santana represented Brazil at the Miss Universe 2016 pageant and placed in the Top 13.

Results

Special Awards

Contestants

References

External links 
Official Miss Brasil Website
Miss Brasil 2016 Full Show (in Brazilian Portuguese)

2016
2016 in Brazil
2016 beauty pageants